Old Vicarage may refer to:

 East Ruston Old Vicarage, Norfolk, England
 Old Vicarage, Grantchester, a building in Cambridgeshire, England
 The Old Vicarage, Grantchester, a poem
 The Old Vicarage, Derbyshire, near Sheffield, England
 The Old Vicarage, Wakefield, West Yorkshire, England

See also 
 The Vicarage (disambiguation)